Nuclear transition protein 2 is a protein that in humans is encoded by the TNP2 gene.

References

Further reading